Nikolaj Hust (born October 30, 1978) is a Danish professional football player, played for FC Andrea Doria. He most recently played for the Danish 1st Division club Vejle Boldklub.

External links
Vejle Boldklub profile
Danish national team profile

Living people
1978 births
Danish men's footballers
Denmark under-21 international footballers
FC Midtjylland players
Aarhus Gymnastikforening players
Vejle Boldklub players
Ikast FS players
Association football midfielders